The Sapugaskanda is a  power station located in Sapugaskanda, adjacent to the Sapugaskanda Oil Refinery, in the Western Province of Sri Lanka. The power station consists of twelve generating units, supplied by MAN, and Siemens. The power station is operated by the Ceylon Electricity Board.

These four  units make up the Sapugaskanda-A division.

All units run on diesel.

See also 
 Asia Power Sapugaskanda Power Station
 Lakdhanavi Power Station
 List of power stations in Sri Lanka

References 

Oil-fired power stations in Sri Lanka
Buildings and structures in Gampaha District